Wazir Ali Khan (19 April 1780 – 15 May 1817) was the fourth Nawab wazir of Oudh from 21 September 1797 to 21 January 1798 and the adopted son of Asaf-Ud-Daulah.

Life

He was the adopted son of Asaf-ud-Daulah, who had no son. He adopted a boy who was the son of his sister. At 13 years of age, Ali was married at the cost of £300,000 in Lucknow.

After the death of his surrogate father in September 1797, he ascended to the throne (musnud), with the support of the British. Within four months they accused him of being unfaithful. Sir John Shore (1751–1834) then moved in with 12 battalions and replaced him with his uncle Saadat Ali Khan II.

Ali was granted a pension of 3,00,000 Rupees and moved to Benares. The government in Calcutta decided that he should be removed further from his former realm. George Frederick Cherry, a British resident, relayed this order to him on 14January 1799 during a breakfast invitation at which Ali had appeared with an armed guard. During the ensuing argument, Ali struck Cherry a blow with his saber, whereupon the guards killed the resident and two more Europeans. They then set out to attack the house of Samuel Davis, the Magistrate of Benares, who defended himself on the staircase of his house with a pike until rescued by British troops. The affair became known as the Massacre of Benares.

Subsequently, Ali assembled a rebellious army of several thousand men. A quickly assembled force commanded by General Erskine moved into Benares and "restored order" by 21 January. Ali fled to Azamgarh then to Butwal, Rajputana where he was granted asylum by the Raja of Jaipur. On request of Arthur Wellesley, Earl of Mornington, the Raja turned Ali over to the British on the condition that he neither be hanged nor be put in fetters. Ali surrendered to the British authorities in December 1799 and was placed in rigorous confinement at Fort William, Calcutta.

The colonial government complied with this: Ali spent the rest of life – 17 years – in an iron cage in Fort William in the Bengal Presidency. He was buried in the Muslim graveyard of Kasi Baghan.

Children 
Mirza Jalaluddin Haidar Ali Jhan Bahadur born 1798, married and got Issue
Nawab Mubarak ud-Daula, who moved to Ottoman Empire
Mirza Muhammad Ali Khan
Sahibzadi Saadatunnisa Begum

Timeline

Literature
 Baillie, Laureen (Hrsg.): Indian Biographical Archiv; München, Fiche  492
 Davis, John Francis (1795–1890); Vizier Ali Khan; or, The massacre of Benares: a chapter in British Indian history .. (1871) (Orig. 1844) 
 Higginbotham, J. J.; Men Whom India has Known. 1874
 Ray, Aniruddha; Revolt of Vizir Ali of Oudh at Benares in 1799; in: Proceedings of the Indian History Congress, 49th Session, Karnatak University, Dharwad, 1988: S 331–338
Kartoos by Habib Tanvir

Notes

References

External links
 National Informatics Centre, Lucknow – Rulers of Awadh
 NAWABS OF OUDH & THEIR SECULARISM – Dr. B. S. Saxena
 HISTORY OF AWADH (Oudh) a princely State of India by Hameed Akhtar Siddiqui

1780 births
People from Lucknow
Wazir
1817 deaths
Indian Shia Muslims
Mughal Empire people